Rougemont – Chanteloup is a railway station located on the Île-de-France tramway Line 4 in the commune of Sevran. The station is situated between the neighborhood of Rougemont in Sevran and the industrial park of Chanteloup in Aulnay-sous-Bois.

External links
 

Railway stations in France opened in 2006
Railway stations in Seine-Saint-Denis